Look Now Look Again is the second studio album by American indie rock band Rainer Maria. It is now regarded as an influential classic of second-wave emo.

Critical reception and legacy
In recent years, Looks critical standing has remained positive, especially within the emo scene where it has been dubbed "a bona fide classic". Jenn Pelly for Pitchfork dubbed it "[an] emo masterpiece", seeing it pave the musical groundwork for future bands like Rilo Kiley, Paramore, and Camp Cope.

Track listing
All songs by Rainer Maria.

"Rise" – 4:18
"Planetary" – 5:21
"Broken Radio" – 3:11
"Feeling Neglected?" – 4:43
"Breakfast of Champions" – 3:37
"The Reason The Night Is Long" – 3:48
"Lost, Dropped and Cancelled" – 2:45
"Centrifuge" – 3:37
"I'm Melting!" – 3:14

Personnel

Caithlin De Marrais – bass/vocals
Kaia Fischer – guitar/vocals
William Kuehn – drums
Mark Haines – producer, engineer 
Elliot Dicks – producer
John Golden – mastering

References

Rainer Maria albums
2001 albums
Polyvinyl Record Co. albums